Dovegh, previously also known as Dvegh, is a village in the Noyemberyan Municipality of the Tavush Province of Armenia.

Notable people 
 Tatul Hakobyan – reporter and political analyst

References

External links 

Populated places in Tavush Province